Minuscule 148 (in the Gregory-Aland numbering), ε 132 (Soden), is a Greek minuscule manuscript of the New Testament, on parchment leaves. Palaeographically it has been assigned to the 11th century. It has marginalia.

Description 

The codex contains a complete text of the four Gospels on 153 parchment leaves (size ).
The text is written in one column per page, in 21 lines per page.

There is also another division according to the smaller Ammonian Sections (in Mark 234, last numbered section in 16:9), with references to the Eusebian Canons (written below Ammonian Section numbers).

Text 

The Greek text of the codex is a representative of the Byzantine text-type. Hermann von Soden classified it to the textual family Kx. Aland placed it in Category V.

According to the Claremont Profile Method it belongs to the textual family Kx in Luke 1, Luke 10, and Luke 20.

The text of the Gospels has some unusual readings.

History 

Birch and Scrivener dated it to the 13th century. 
Gregory dated it to the 11th century. Currently it is dated by the INTF to the 11th century.

The manuscript was examined by Birch (about 1782) and Scholz. C. R. Gregory saw the manuscript in 1886.

It is currently housed at the Vatican Library (Pal. gr. 136), at Rome.

See also 

 List of New Testament minuscules
 Biblical manuscript
 Textual criticism

References

Further reading 

 

Greek New Testament minuscules
11th-century biblical manuscripts
Manuscripts of the Vatican Library